Dame Heather Jane McGregor  (born 27 March 1962) is a British executive, journalist, and academic. She is the Provost and Vice Principal of Heriot-Watt University Dubai since 1 September 2022. Prior to that and since 2016, she has been Executive Dean of Edinburgh Business School, Heriot Watt University. She wrote a column for the Financial Times from 1999 to 2016 as "Mrs Moneypenny", and was the chief executive of Taylor Bennett from 2000 to 2016.

In 2008, McGregor established the Taylor Bennett Foundation, a charity that encourages black, Asian and minority ethnic people to consider a career in communications and PR. She was a founding member of the 30% Club, which campaigns for more women on the boards of FTSE 100 companies.

She was appointed Commander of the Order of the British Empire (CBE) in the 2015 Birthday Honours for services to business, especially employment skills and diversity in the workplace, and Dame Commander of the Order of the British Empire (DBE) in the 2023 New Year Honours for services to education, business and heritage in Scotland.

She was also elected as a fellow to the Royal Society of Edinburgh in March 2021.

McGregor was a columnist for The Sunday Times between September 2019 and March 2021.

References

External links
 "Mrs Moneypenny", Financial Times. Accessed 30 December 2022.
 Fellows of the Royal Society of Edinburgh, Edinburghreporter.co.uk. Accessed 30 December 2022.

1962 births
Living people
British chief executives
British women chief executives
British columnists
Financial Times people
Dames Commander of the Order of the British Empire
Academics of Heriot-Watt University
Fellows of the Royal Society of Edinburgh